The MR8 road is a major highway of Eswatini. Along with the MR3 and MR7 roads it is considered to form the "backbone of Eswatini's internal transport system." It passes through the Mkhaya Game Reserve.

References

Roads in Eswatini